Lindu may refer to:
 Lindu people, an ethnic group from Indonesia
 Lindu language, a language spoken in Indonesia
 Yichun, Heilongjiang, a city in China nicknamed Lindu (meaning "forest city")